In Limbo is an EP by American rock musician Lydia Lunch, released in 1984 on Doublevision. It is largely a collaboration with Thurston Moore.

Reception 
AllMusic called the EP "something of a return to the nearly atonal cacophony of Lunch's earliest work, but with greater delicacy and subtlety thanks largely to collaborator Thurston Moore's skill at varied and intriguing sonic moods". Billboard wrote of the EP: "Add deathbed vocals to what sounds like a bad soundtrack to an even worse horror flick and you've got Lydia Lunch's latest faintly interesting, very depressing, poetic effort". Head Heritage described it as "one of Lunch's strongest statements. A difficult, overlooked but vital gem".

Track listing

Personnel 
Musicians

Richard Edson – drums
Kristian Hoffman – piano
Lydia Lunch – vocals
Thurston Moore – bass guitar
Pat Place – guitar
Jim Sclavunos – saxophone

Production and technical

Donny Bill – engineering
Dan Dryden – engineering
George N. Carstens, Lydia Lunch - cover design
Nan Goldin - photography

Charts

References

External links 
 

1984 EPs
Lydia Lunch albums
Post-punk EPs